Dennis Haskell (born 1948) is an Australian poet, critic and academic.

Life and work
Haskell was born in Sydney, New South Wales, and studied for a Bachelor of Commerce degree at the University of NSW before completing a PhD in Literature at the University of Sydney.

Haskell began teaching English in 1973 in Sydney before moving to Perth in 1984. He is currently an Emeritus Professor/Senior Honorary Research Fellow in the School of English and Cultural Studies at the University of Western Australia. His keys areas of research are: 1) Australian Literature, especially Twentieth Century and Contemporary Australian Literature; 2) Poetry from the Medieval period to the present; 3) Creative Writing; 4) South-east Asian Writing in English; 5) Literary Modernism (1890-1939); 6) Modernism and after; and 7) Post-colonial.

Haskell co-edited the literary magazine Westerly from 1985 to 2009. He is now the director of the Westerly Centre at the University of Western Australia. He was chair of the Australia Council's Literature Board from 2009 to 2011.

Apart from writing his own poetry, Haskell has produced a number of critical studies of the works of Australian poets such as Bruce Dawe and Kenneth Slessor.

In 2011 Haskell was awarded the ASAL (Association for the Study of Australian Literature): A.A. Phillips Award for his 'long period of excellence in the editing of Westerly'.

Awards 
 2003 shortlisted New South Wales Premier's Literary Awards — Gleebooks Prize for Literary or Cultural Criticism for Attuned to Alien Moonlight: The Poetry of Bruce Dawe
 2006 winner Western Australian Premier's Book Awards — Poetry for All the Time in the World

Bibliography

Poetry collections
 Listening at Night (1984)
 A Touch of Ginger with Fay Zwicky (1992)
 Abracadabra (1993)
 The Ghost Names Sing: Poems (1997)
 All the Time in the World (2006)
 Acts of Defiance: New and Selected Poems (2010)
 Poetry D'Amour 2013: Love Poetry for Valentine's Day (2013)

Critical studies
 Kenneth Slessor: Poetry, Essays, War Despatches, War Diaries, Journalism, Autobiographical Material and Letters (1991)
 Kenneth Slessor: Collected Poems edited with Geoffrey Dutton (1994)
 Attuned to Alien Moonlight: The Poetry of Bruce Dawe (2002)

Edited
 Wordhord: A Critical Selection of Contemporary Western Australian Poetry edited with Hilary Fraser (1989)
 Whose Place?: A Study of Sally Morgan's 'My Place'  edited with Delys Bird (1992)
 Myths, Heroes and Anti-Heroes: Essays on the Literature and Culture of the Asia-Pacific Region edited with Bruce Bennett (1992)
 Westerly Looks to Asia: A Selection from Westerly 1956-1992 with  Bruce Bennett, Susan Miller, and, Peter Cowan (1993)
 Tilting at Matilda: Literature, Aborigines, Women and the Church in Contemporary Australia (1994)
 Sightings: poems for International PEN 62nd World Congress edited with John Kinsella (1995)
 Interactions: Essays on the Literature and Culture of the Asia-Pacific Region edited with Ron Shapiro (2000)
 Beyond Good And Evil? Essays on the Literature and Culture of the Asia-Pacific Region edited with Megan McKinlay and Pamina Rich (2005)
 Poems 2013: Volume of the Australian Poetry Members Anthology edited with Jessica Friedman and Chris Wallace-Crabb

References

1948 births
Living people
Australian poets
Date of birth missing (living people)